Marc G. D'Amour (born May 29, 1961) is a Canadian retired professional ice hockey goaltender. He played 16 National Hockey League (NHL) games for the Calgary Flames and Philadelphia Flyers.

Playing career
D'Amour played four seasons of junior hockey with the Sault Ste. Marie Greyhounds between 1978 and 1982 before signing as a free agent with the Flames.  After bouncing around the Flames minor league system, he earned his first call-up to the NHL in 1985–86.  He played 15 games with the Flames but after posting only two victories, lost his job to Mike Vernon.  He played one game for the Flyers in 1988–89, but otherwise remained in the minor leagues until he retired in 1992.

References

External links
 

1961 births
Binghamton Whalers players
Calgary Flames players
Canadian ice hockey goaltenders
Colorado Flames players
Fort Wayne Komets players
Franco-Ontarian people
Hershey Bears players
Ice hockey people from Ontario
Sportspeople from Greater Sudbury
Indianapolis Ice players
Living people
Moncton Golden Flames players
Philadelphia Flyers players
Salt Lake Golden Eagles (IHL) players
Sault Ste. Marie Greyhounds players
Undrafted National Hockey League players
Canadian expatriate ice hockey players in the United States